Cherry is an English surname. Notable people with the surname include:

 Blair Cherry (1901–1966), American baseball and football coach
 Bobby Frank Cherry (1930–2004), American terrorist and klansman
 Byron Cherry (born 1955), American actor
 Caroline Janice Cherry (born 1942), American science fiction author, who writes under the nom de plume C.J. Cherryh
 Célena Cherry (born 1977), British singer
 Colin Cherry (1914–1979), British cognitive scientist
 Daly Cherry-Evans (born 1989), Australian Rugby League player
 Don Cherry (disambiguation)
 Don Cherry (jazz) (1936–1995), American trumpeter
 Don Cherry (singer) (1924–2018), American singer and golfer
 E. Daniel Cherry (born 1939), a brigadier general and command pilot in the U.S. Air Force who served in the Vietnam War
 Eagle-Eye Cherry (born 1971), Swedish-born American musician
 Francis Cherry (disambiguation)
 Fred Cherry (1926—2003), American activist
 Fred V. Cherry (1928-2018), a colonel and command pilot in the U.S. Air Force who served in the Korean War, the Cold War, and the Vietnam War
 Gladys Cherry (1881–1965), British Titanic survivor
 Gregg Cherry (1891–1957), American politician
 Helen Cherry (1915–2001), British actress
 Henry P. Cherry (1823–1895), Michigan politician
 Jake Cherry (born 1996), American actor
 John Cherry (disambiguation)
 Jonathan Cherry (born 1978), Canadian actor 
 Kathryn E. Cherry (1880–1931), American impressionist painter and educator
 Kelly Cherry (born 1940), American writer
 Kittredge Cherry, American writer and priest
 Lynne Cherry (born 1952), American writer
 Marc Cherry (born 1962), American writer and producer
 Merrie Cherry, American drag queen
 Neneh Cherry (born 1964), Swedish musician
Sara Cherry, American microbiologist
 Simon Cherry, American biomedical engineer
 Travis Cherry (born 1975), American musician
 Trevor Cherry (1948–2020), English football player
 Wayne Cherry (born 1937), American car designer
 Zach Cherry, American actor and improv comedian

See also
 Apsley Cherry-Garrard (1886–1959), British explorer
 Cherry (disambiguation)